Ganga Lake or Geker Sinying is a lake in Itanagar, the capital of Arunachal Pradesh. It is one of the most popular places in Itanagar. People from all around visit this place as a recreation spot and for the picture perfect view of this lake. Because the lake is still with no connection with moving water bodies, its color is green. Many mythological rumors about the Ganga Lake and its color are heard still. This lake is also known as Gyakar Sinyi and it houses wonderful works of nature.

Surrounded by lush greenery and lofty mountains around, this lake is a must visit place to spend a quiet afternoon amidst the hush murmur of the breeze and warm sunlight. Ganga Lake is located 6 kilometres from Itanagar and the calm water body surrounded by primeval vegetation, various flora and huge trees will certainly spellbind you.

Lakes of India
Itanagar
Lakes of Arunachal Pradesh